Joseph Patrick Prunty MBE (1932 – 29 January 2021) was a Northern Irish businessman and Gaelic footballer who played for club side Roslea Shamrocks and was a member of the Fermanagh junior football team that won the 1959 All-Ireland Junior Championship.

Biography

Born in Rosslea, Prunty was immersed in Gaelic football from a young age and was part of an Roslea Shamrocks team which won four County Senior Championships in succession from 1955 to 1958. He was also a substitute on the Fermanagh junior team that won the All-Ireland Championship in 1959. Having left school at 14, Prunty  worked on the family farm until he was 20 before setting up his own agriculture business. From there he worked developing his ploughing and drainage skills and eventually established Prunty Pitches, a company that became well known for developing GAA fields using a unique sand-based drainage system.

Honours

Roslea Shamrocks
Fermanagh Senior Football Championship: 1955, 1956, 1957, 1958

Fermanagh
 All-Ireland Junior Football Championship: 1959
 Ulster Junior Football Championship: 1959

References

1932 births
2021 deaths
Roslea Shamrocks Gaelic footballers
Fermanagh inter-county Gaelic footballers
Members of the Order of the British Empire